The 73rd Primetime Creative Arts Emmy Awards honored the best in artistic and technical achievement in American prime time television programming from June 1, 2020, until May 31, 2021, as chosen by the Academy of Television Arts & Sciences. The awards were presented across three ceremonies on September 11 and 12, 2021, at the Event Deck at L.A. Live in Downtown Los Angeles, California, preceding the 73rd Primetime Emmy Awards on September 19. A total of 99 Creative Arts Emmys were presented across 92 categories. The ceremonies were produced by Bob Bain, directed by Rich Preuss, and broadcast in the United States by FXX on September 18.

The Queen's Gambit won nine awards, leading all programs; The Mandalorian and Saturday Night Live followed with seven wins each. The Mandalorian also received the most nominations with 19, followed by WandaVision with 15 and Saturday Night Live with 14. Program awards went to Boys State, Carpool Karaoke: The Series, Dolly Parton's Christmas on the Square, For All Mankind: Time Capsule, Genndy Tartakovsky's Primal, Love, Death & Robots, Queer Eye, RuPaul's Drag Race: Untucked, Secrets of the Whales, Space Explorers: The ISS Experience, Stanley Tucci: Searching for Italy, Uncomfortable Conversations with a Black Man, and 76 Days. Netflix led all networks with 34 wins and 104 nominations.

Winners and nominees

Winners are listed first, highlighted in boldface, and indicated with a double dagger (‡). Sections are based upon the categories listed in the 2020–2021 Emmy rules and procedures. Area awards and juried awards are denoted next to the category names as applicable. For simplicity, producers who received nominations for program awards have been omitted.

Programs

Performing

Animation

Art Direction

Casting

Choreography

Cinematography

Commercial

Costumes

Directing

Hairstyling

Lighting Design / Lighting Direction

Main Title and Motion Design

Makeup

Music

Picture Editing

Sound Editing

Sound Mixing

Special Visual Effects

Stunts

Technical Direction

Writing

Nominations and wins by program
For the purposes of the lists below, any wins in juried categories are assumed to have a prior nomination.

Nominations and wins by network

Ceremony order and presenters
The following categories were presented at each ceremony:

Ceremony information
The nominations for the 73rd Primetime Creative Arts Emmy Awards were announced on July 13, 2021, by Ron and Jasmine Cephas Jones via a virtual event. On July 21, the Academy of Television Arts & Sciences, also known as the Television Academy, revealed that the Creative Arts Emmys would be presented in two ceremonies on Saturday, September 11, and Sunday, September 12; the previous year's ceremonies had been spread out over five days due to the COVID-19 pandemic. The two ceremonies were scheduled to be held at the Microsoft Theater. On July 30, the event was split into three ceremonies scheduled for Saturday evening, Sunday afternoon, and Sunday evening. The combined ceremonies aired in an edited two-hour broadcast on September 18 on FXX.

On August 10, the ceremonies were moved to the indoor-outdoor Event Deck at L.A. Live due to ongoing COVID-19 concerns. Additionally, the Television Academy announced that nominated teams would be limited to four tickets per nomination. Despite the changes, producer Bob Bain sought to create an event that closely resembled pre-pandemic ceremonies "in terms of energy" while still making changes as needed. Unlike previous ceremonies, audiences were seated at tables, similar to the Golden Globe Awards or Critics' Choice Awards, while the shift from the traditional two ceremonies to three allowed the event to have better pacing, according to Bain. The event did not have a host; instead, each ceremony used a "show opener" to kick off the event, then relied on presenters to keep the ceremony moving. To minimize COVID-19 risks, winners received their trophies on a separate stage from the presenters, and microphones were wiped down between speeches. Attendees were also required to show proof of vaccination and a negative COVID-19 test before the event.

Category and rule changes
Several changes that were implemented for these ceremonies include:
 Outstanding Short Form Comedy or Drama Series and Outstanding Short Form Variety Series were merged to form Outstanding Short Form Comedy, Drama or Variety Series.
 Outstanding Derivative Interactive Program, Outstanding Original Interactive Program, and Outstanding Interactive Extension of a Linear Program were merged to form Outstanding Interactive Program.
 Outstanding Stunt Coordination for a Comedy Series or Variety Program and Outstanding Stunt Coordination for a Drama Series, Limited Series, or Movie were merged to form Outstanding Stunt Coordination, and a new category for Outstanding Stunt Performance was created.
 Outstanding Special Visual Effects and Outstanding Special Visual Effects in a Supporting Role were reorganized to form Outstanding Special Visual Effects in a Season or a Movie and Outstanding Special Visual Effects in a Single Episode.
 Outstanding Costumes for Variety, Nonfiction or Reality Programming became a juried award.
 Outstanding Period and/or Character Hairstyling and Outstanding Period and/or Character Makeup (Non-Prosthetic) became area awards.
 Outstanding Choreography for Scripted Programming was modified to allow nominations.
 Anthology series became eligible in the limited series categories, which were renamed accordingly.
 Any programs that were nominated for Academy Awards, as well as any non-documentary programs that were placed on the Academy of Motion Picture Arts and Sciences viewing platform, were no longer eligible for Emmys.
 All children's programming was moved to the Daytime Emmy Awards, run by the National Academy of Television Arts & Sciences.

In addition, the awards for Outstanding Writing for a Variety Series and Outstanding Variety Special (Pre-Recorded) were moved to the main ceremony in July, followed by the awards for Outstanding Variety Sketch Series and Outstanding Variety Special (Live) in August.

Notes

References

External links
 73rd Primetime Creative Arts Emmy Awards at Emmys.com
 
 Academy of Television Arts and Sciences website

073 Creative Arts
2021 in American television
2021 in Los Angeles
2021 awards in the United States
2021 television awards
September 2021 events in the United States